Spring Garden station is an abandoned subway rapid transit station on the SEPTA Broad–Ridge Spur, located under Ridge Avenue between Spring Garden Street and Buttonwood Street.

The Broad-Ridge Spur, including Spring Garden station, opened on December 21, 1932. By the late 1980s, Spring Garden station was lightly used and exit-only; it was frequently occupied by drug users and dealers. After no substantial opposition from nearby residents, SEPTA closed the station on September 10, 1989. The now abandoned station, visible from passing trains, is heavily graffitied. A single entrance, covered with steel, is still present on the west side of Ridge Avenue just north of Buttonwood Street.

References

External links

Railway stations in the United States opened in 1932
Railway stations closed in 1989
Railway stations in Philadelphia
SEPTA Broad Street Line stations
Abandoned rapid transit stations